Asad Badie is a singer from Afghanistan of pop music.  He is one of the 1980s era singers that emerged as Afghan music was reaching the zenith of its international popularity.  As a member of Goroh-e-Baran (Rain Band/ Best Friends), that included Farhad Darya and others, he became immensely popular not only for his voice, but also for his looks.  Badie continues to produce music from his homes in Switzerland and Austria, and often performs in charity concerts.

Badie is also a physician, having completed his medical degree in Switzerland.

The Look 

In the early 1980s, when he and others started the Rain Band, he was under the constant spotlight of public attention, although Farhad Darya went on to become the more popular singer after the group members emigrated from Afghanistan.

Recent Involvements 

Badie performs in concerts in various cities of Europe. In the last two decades since he separated from his Rain Band colleagues, he has been the least active in singing. Due to the demands of medical school and subsequent demands of the medical profession, he has limited his involvement in entertainment, prompting his fans to become inquisitive of his status.

Nickname 

In recent times, his nickname has become Asad "Hard" Badie.

References 

Javanan.  The Sensational Asad Badie.  Kabul, Afghanistan. June 1989.

Year of birth missing (living people)
Living people
20th-century Afghan male singers
21st-century Afghan male singers